Occupation Double (sometimes referenced as OD) is a Canadian French language reality show which first aired in 2003. It is broadcast on V, following a decade during which it was broadcast on TVA. The host of the show is comedian Jay Du Temple.

The sixth edition of Occupation Double premiered on September 27, 2009. For the first time, the entirety of the show took place in a foreign country, the Dominican Republic. The seventh season took place in Whistler, British Columbia; the eighth, in Portugal; the ninth, in the United States; the tenth, in Spain and French Polynesia; the eleventh, in Indonesia; the twelfth, in Greece; and the thirteenth, in South Africa. In 2020, it was announced that the show would be filmed in Quebec due to the COVID-19 pandemic in Quebec in a season entitled, "OD: Chez Nous".

See also
List of Quebec television series
Television of Quebec
Culture of Quebec
Reality television

References

External links
 Occupation Double at noovo.ca

Television shows filmed in Quebec
2000s Canadian reality television series
TVA (Canadian TV network) original programming
2003 Canadian television series debuts
2010s Canadian reality television series
Noovo original programming
2020s Canadian reality television series